Robert 'Bob' Edward Stansky is an American portfolio manager who served as manager of the Magellan Fund from June 1996 to October 2005, before that he managed the Fidelity Growth Company Fund since 1987. He joined Fidelity Investments in 1983 starting as a research analyst. In 1984 and '85 he was put in charge of the Fidelity Select Defense and Aerospace Portfolio.

He earned a BA from Nichols College in 1978 and an MBA from New York University in 1983.

References 

Douglas Feiden (6/3/1996). "For New Magellan Rein Man, It's Giddyap Let The Fund Begin". New York Daily News.
Leslie Eaton (5/24/1996). "A New Magellan Helmsman Cast From Peter Lynch's Mold;Robert Stansky Follows Mentor's 'Growth' Tack". The New York Times.
Riva D. Atlas (11/1/2005). "Turnover at Top Fund of Fidelity". The New York Times.

Living people
American investors
Year of birth missing (living people)
Nichols College alumni
New York University alumni